The Treasury Board of Canada is the Cabinet committee of the Privy Council of Canada which oversees the spending and operation of the Government of Canada and is the principal employer of the core public service. The committee is supported by the Treasury Board of Canada Secretariat, its administrative branch and a department within the government itself.

The committee is chaired by the president of the Treasury Board, currently Mona Fortier, who is also the minister responsible for the Treasury Board of Canada Secretariat.

Role
The Canadian Cabinet is arranged into several committees with varying responsibilities, but all other ones are informal structures and frequently change. Currently organized under the Financial Administration Act, the Treasury Board is the only one created by law and is officially a committee of the Privy Council.

Its role in government makes it far more powerful than most Cabinet committees as it is responsible for "accountability and ethics, financial, personnel and administrative management, comptrollership, approving regulations and most Orders-in-Council". It is also unique in that its committee chair, the president of the Treasury Board, is a member of Cabinet by virtue of holding that office—other Cabinet committees are chaired by minister holding seats in Cabinet by virtue of some other office.

Expenditure management 
The Treasury Board oversees the expenditures of the federal government. Ministers submit funding proposals on behalf of their departments to seek financial approval for programs and policies approved in the federal budget or by Cabinet. The president of the Treasury Board is responsible for presenting the Estimates from these submissions to Parliament. The Estimates are prepared by the Secretariat in collaboration with the Department of Finance Canada.

Management and performance policies and principal employer 
The Treasury Board, on advice of the Secretariat, sets policies regulating the authority of ministers and deputy ministers to administer and manage their departments, ensuring a government-wide to administration.

As the principal employer of the Government of Canada, it is responsible for labour relations, collective bargaining, and pension and benefits across the core public administration.

Secretariat 

The Treasury Board is supported by the Treasury Board of Canada Secretariat, a federal department which acts as a central agency of the Government of Canada and is administered by members of the public service. The role of the Secretariat is to advise members the Treasury Board, develop policies for approval and administer certain programs on behalf of the Treasury Board.

Membership
The Treasury Board is composed of six Cabinet ministers, always including its president and the minister of finance. The current members, as of December 3, 2021, are as follows:

There are also a number of alternate members, who may attend Treasury Board meetings in the event of conflicts of interest. The prime minister, through a Governor in Council appointment, may designate as many alternate members as the committee may need. As of December 3, 2021, the following are alternate members of the Treasury Board:

See also
 Security clearances
 Info Source
 Common Look and Feel

Related legislation
 Access to Information Act
 Auditor General Act
 Official Languages Act
 Privacy Act, 1983
 Security of Information Act

References

Bibliography

External links
 Treasury Board of Canada Secretariat
 Former Presidents of the Treasury Board

Government of Canada
Committees